Borimir Perković (born 25 September 1967) is a Croatian professional football manager and former player who is the manager of Croatian Football League club Osijek.

During his club career, he played for numerous clubs in Croatia, collecting over 300 caps and scoring over 50 goals. Although a versatile and talented midfielder, Perković never earned a cap for the Croatia national team.

Managerial career
Perković started as manager with Inter Zaprešić in 2008, later moving to Saudi Arabia, at Al-Faisaly, with Zlatko Dalić, who was named as the head coach. In 2012 he came back to Croatia and was named the manager of Inter Zaprešić again. In 2014, again with Dalić, he moved to United Arab Emirates at Al-Ain. The club reached the final game of the AFC Champions League in 2016, which unfortunately lost.

On 30 August 2017, Perković was appointed the head coach of Croatian Second Football League club HNK Šibenik. In his first season with the club based on Croatian coast, he finished in 7th in the league. On 5 June 2019, two days after Šibenik lost to Istra 1961 in two qualification games for the qualification for the first tier, he terminated the contract with the club.

On 22 June 2019, Perković was named the new manager of Prva HNL club Varaždin. On 8 October 2019, he was sacked by the club, following a series of defeats in the league.

Perković was left without a club in summer 2022 after leaving Inter Zaprešić.

Honours

Player
Inker Zaprešić
Croatian Cup: 1992

Osijek
Croatian Cup: 1999

Manager
Šibenik
Croatian Second League runner-up: 2018–19

References

External links

1967 births
Living people
Sportspeople from Livno
Association football midfielders
Yugoslav footballers
Croatian footballers
NK Zagreb players
NK Inter Zaprešić players
HNK Rijeka players
NK Osijek players
Hapoel Petah Tikva F.C. players
Bnei Yehuda Tel Aviv F.C. players
NK Slaven Belupo players
NK Kamen Ingrad players
Croatian Football League players
Israeli Premier League players
Liga Leumit players
Croatian expatriate footballers
Expatriate footballers in Israel
Croatian expatriate sportspeople in Israel
Croatian football managers
NK Inter Zaprešić managers
HNK Šibenik managers
NK Varaždin managers
NK Osijek managers
Croatian Football League managers
Croatian expatriate sportspeople in Saudi Arabia
Croatian expatriate sportspeople in the United Arab Emirates